Mahmoud Mohamed Aboud (Maḥmūd Muḥammad ʿAbbūd; born May 20, 1960) is a Comorian ambassador.

Career
Between 1982 and 1987 he worked in the Hotel Division of the Comoros Ministry of Tourism. In 1994, after a stint in various educational posts, he joined the Permanent Mission of the Comoros to the UN, in New York. He rose through the ranks to become Deputy Permanent Representative by 2010, when he was appointed Ambassador-at-Large to China, Japan, South Korea, Thailand, before becoming the Comoros' ambassador to China in Beijing in August 2011. From 24 April 2014 he was co-accredited to Singapore. He has also been Non-resident Ambassador to Japan since 2014, and he presented his credentials to Emperor Akihito at the Imperial Palace in Tokyo on July 11, 2014.

Other tasks 
2010: Commissioner General, Shanghai Expo 2010, China
2012: Commissioner General, Yeosu Expo 2012, South Korea

References

1960 births
Living people
Ambassadors of the Comoros to China
Ambassadors of the Comoros to Japan
Ambassadors of the Comoros to Singapore
Place of birth missing (living people)